Trinity Universe may refer to:

 Trinity Universe (video game), a 2009 role-playing video game
 Trinity Universe (setting), a fictional universe created by White Wolf Publishing